Wrecking Ball is the first full-length album from the band, Dead Confederate. It was recorded in Austin, TX with producer Mike McCarthy  (Spoon, ...And You Will Know Us by the Trail of Dead, Heartless Bastards) in January 2008.

Track listing

Personnel
Dead Confederate
 Hardy Morris - vocals, electric guitar, acoustic guitar
 Brantley Senn - bass, vocals
 Walker Howle - electric guitar
 John Watkins - keyboards
 Jason Scarboro - drums

Production
 Mike McCarthy - producer, mixing, engineer
 Jim Vollentine - engineer
Bob Ludwig - mastering
 Joel Wheat - artwork

References

External links
 Official Website - Dead Confederate

2008 albums
Dead Confederate albums